The Rubicon River is a minor river in the South Island of New Zealand.  It starts on the southeast flanks of the Torlesse Range and feeds into the Kowai River.

Rivers of Canterbury, New Zealand
Rivers of New Zealand